The Keough Award is an award given to the top male and female soccer players from the St. Louis, Missouri area. It was established in 2004 and is named after former United States men's national soccer team member and St. Louis University men's soccer coach Harry Keough and his son Ty.

Winners

References
Joe Lyons, "Area players honored", St. Louis Post-Dispatch, June 18, 2006
High School Senior All-Star Games: 2007 All-Star Games Feature Two Shutouts, Missouri Athletic Club
https://stlsoccerhalloffame.com/the-keough-awards/

American soccer trophies and awards
Soccer in St. Louis
Awards established in 2004